Thylacogaster monospora is a species of moth of the family Tortricidae. It is found in the Democratic Republic of Congo and Nigeria.

The larvae feed on Garcinia ovalifolia, Garcinia xanthochymus, Allanblackia floribunda, Ricinodendron africanum and Symphonia globulifera.

References

Moths described in 1939
Eucosmini